The Last Matinee is a 2020 Spanish-language horror film also known as Red Screening directed by Maximiliano Contenti. An international co-production of Uruguay and Argentina, the film stars Luciana Grasso, Ricardo Islas, Julieta Spinelli, and Franco Durán. It premiered in Uruguay in September 2020. Set in 1993 in Montevideo, an engineering student named Ana takes over the duties of her father, a projectionist at a declining movie theatre. Unbeknownst to her, the audience watching the film at the theatre is being murdered by a black-gloved killer.

Plot 
In 1993 in Montevideo, a mysterious man dressed in a black coat and wearing black gloves sneaks into a declining movie theatre. Eventually, an engineering student named Ana, who is the daughter of the theatre projectionist, arrives to take over her father's duties for him due to his ill health; likewise, she also needs a place to study for an exam. Even though he refuses at first, he reluctantly leaves as Ana has already known how to use a movie projector since an early age.

At the theatre where a thriller movie is running, the man in the black coat stealthily kills an old man unbeknownst to the rest of the audience: a trio of teenagers, a couple on a date, a boy who sneaks in, and a girl waiting for her boyfriend. Ana is visited by Mauricio, a cocky security guard who asks her about an alarm clock he left in the projector room to remind him to take his pills. Ana feels frustrated due to the distraction, asks him to leave her alone to study, and Mauricio bitterly agrees, saying he will take a nap downstairs. After Mauricio sees the ticket seller leaving, he is murdered when his throat is sliced by the killer at the theater entrance. Having killed the guard, the killer locks the theater using a metal bar. He then tries to enter the projection room but he can't, due to Ana having locked the door in order not to be disturbed.
 
In the theater, one of the teenagers Goni approaches the lone girl to flirt with her. As they both talk and kiss, the killer murders them by piercing their skulls at once with the metal bar. Meanwhile, the couple prepares to leave, however, the woman Gabriela gives a hand job to her date Horacio, which prompts him to go to the men's room. The killer follows Horacio and kills him inside one of the toilet stalls. Ana finds the alarm clock when it rings and takes it to look for Mauricio; however, she can't find him, so she returns to the projection room.

Goni's friends Angela and Esteban feel something is off with Goni and the girl, as they do not see them moving, so Angela goes down to check on him, only to find the two of them dead. Meanwhile, the killer attacks Gabriela and kills her when he stabs her in the heart with a pocket knife. Due to some technical difficulties Ana confuses the screams with complaints and restores the movie, which had stopped due to the film breaking. She eventually goes down into the theater, finding all the victims with their eyes gouged out, and is horrified. She encounters a frightened Angela, who then barely escapes the killer when she knocks him out with a fire extinguisher. They try to escape but when they find Mauricio's corpse, Ana realizes the killer has the keys. When the killer awakens he chases the boy Tomás, but he is saved by Ana, as she stabs the killer in his right eye with a shard of glass.

Ana, Angela, and Tomás take refuge inside the projection room, where Ana calls the police. However, within seconds the killer breaks through the locked door, and shows them the glass jar in which he keeps the eyes of his victims, as he chews his own severed eye in front of them. As the killer approaches them with a knife, Angela tosses a pile of tapes at him, creating a distraction that allows Tomas and Ana to escape. Angela runs through a back room and tries to escape through the roof stairs, but the killer catches her and kills her by hitting her head repeatedly with the projector, covering it with her blood. Ana comforts Tomás and takes him back to the theater. As they wait for the police, she pulls the metal bar out of the dead teenagers, and they go to the entrance, where the killer then attacks them. Ana is stabbed by the killer, and he then goes after Tomás. Although she is wounded, Ana takes the metal bar and stabs the killer through the chest from behind, killing him. He drops the glass jar and it breaks, scattering eyeballs everywhere. The police arrive at the theater, and as Ana hugs Tomás to comfort him, he stares at the victims' eyes.

Cast

Production 
An international co-production film between Uruguay, Mexico and Argentina. Regarding the film's conception, Maximiliano Contenti stated that wanted to make a film that paid tribute to both Italian giallo films and American slasher films. He added: "[...] I also wanted to pay tribute to the movie theater, to the ceremony of going to see a movie in a theater, to the dark, to the mystery that projections have, which is something we may be saying goodbye to."

The film being shown in the theatre in which The Last Matinee is set is 2011's Frankenstein: Day of the Beast, directed by Ricardo Islas, who plays the killer Come Ojos in The Last Matinee.

Release
The Last Matinee premiered in Uruguay on 3 September 2020. It screened at the Sitges Film Festival that same year. It later screened at both Panic Fest and the Cleveland International Film Festival in April 2021.

On 15 April 2021, it was announced that Dark Star Pictures has acquired the North American distribution rights to the film, in collaboration with horror outfit Bloody Disgusting. The film was scheduled to be released in theatres in North America on August 6, 2021, before being released on video-on-demand, digital platforms, and DVD on August 24. It has since been shown in the United States on channels such as Showtime and The Movie Channel.

Awards 
The Last Matinee won the award for the Best Ibero-American Fantastic Film at the Curtas Festival do Imaxinario 2020. It was a candidate for Best Latin American Film at the 2020 Mar del Plata International Film Festival.

References

External links
 

2020 films
2020 horror films
Uruguayan horror films
Mexican horror films
Films set in Montevideo
Films shot in Uruguay